The 1935 Calgary Bronks season was the first in franchise history where the team finished in 1st place in the Alberta Rugby Football Union with a 2–0 division record. The Bronks played in the Western Title game, but lost to the eventual Grey Cup champion, the Winnipegs.

Exhibition games

Regular season

Standings

Schedule

Playoffs

See also
List of Calgary Bronks (football) seasons

References

1935 in Alberta
1935 in Canadian sports